Colonel Janybek Akmatovich Kaparov (born 8 May 1970 in Ala-Buka, Jalal-Abad Region, Kirghiz Soviet Socialist Republic) is a Kyrgyzstani officer and a former Chief of the General Staff of the Armed Forces of Kyrgyzstan (2015–2016).

Career 
In 1992 he graduated from the Tashkent Higher Combined-Arms Command School, and In 2001, he graduated with honors, from the Combined Arms Academy of the Russian Armed Forces. He served in the task force from the Collective Security Treaty Organization that patrolled the Tajik-Afghan border during the Tajikistani Civil War. His first major appointment came in 2012, with his appointment as Commander of the South-Western Regional Command. In 2014, Kaparov served as Deputy Chief of the General Staff of the Armed Forces of Kyrgyzstan and the chief of the Bishkek Military Garrison. On 5 November 2015 he was appointed Chief of the General Staff of the Armed Forces, succeeding Asanbek Alymkozhoev. On 11 May 2016 Kaparov was discharged from this post by order of president Almazbek Atambayev after 6 months on the job.

References 

1970 births
Living people
People from Jalal-Abad Region
Kyrgyzstani military personnel
Chiefs of the General Staff (Kyrgyzstan)

Tashkent Higher All-Arms Command School alumni